Blighter or Blighters may refer to:

Blighter, a character class in the game Dungeons and Dragons
Blighter, a fictional hominid species in the Age of Fire fantasy novels by E. E. Knight
The Blighters, a fictional street gang in the video game Assassin's Creed Syndicate

See also
Blight (disambiguation)
Blighty (disambiguation)